Ochil was a county constituency of the House of Commons of the Parliament of the United Kingdom from 1997 until 2005. It elected one Member of Parliament (MP by the first-past-the-post voting system.

It replaced the former constituency of Clackmannan. In 2005 it was mostly merged into the new constituency of Ochil and South Perthshire. A western portion was merged into Stirling.

Boundaries 
Clackmannan District, the Stirling District electoral divisions of Airthrey and Cairseland, and the Perth and Kinross District electoral division of Kinross.

The constituency included Alloa, Clackmannan, Tillicoultry, Dollar and Kinross. It covered Clackmannanshire and small portions of Stirlingshire and Perth and Kinross.

Members of Parliament

Election results

Elections in the 1990s

References 

Historic parliamentary constituencies in Scotland (Westminster)
Constituencies of the Parliament of the United Kingdom established in 1997
Constituencies of the Parliament of the United Kingdom disestablished in 2005
Politics of Clackmannanshire